Joshua Anthony Charlton Henry (born September 2, 1984) is a Canadian-American actor and singer of stage and screen. 

He is best known for portraying Haywood Patterson in Kander and Ebb's 2010 musical The Scottsboro Boys, for which he received a Tony Award nomination. He has also received Tony Award nominations for his role in Violet and for portraying Billy Bigelow in a Broadway revival of Carousel. He portrayed the lead role of Aaron Burr in the first U.S. tour of Hamilton, previously playing the role in the Chicago production that began performances in late September 2016. His other notable performances include Dr. Pomatter in Waitress, Rapunzel’s Prince in a Broadway revival of Into the Woods, and Gaston in Beauty and the Beast: A 30th Celebration.

Personal life 
Henry was born in Winnipeg, Manitoba, Canada to Zadoc Henry (a teacher at Calvary Christian Academy), and raised in Miami, Florida, United States. He currently resides in Harlem, New York City. He had originally wanted to be an accountant, like his mother. However, he was cast as Harold Hill in his high school (Florida Bible Christian School) production of The Music Man and with the experience he changed his mind. Henry studied theatre at the University of Miami, graduating in 2006. He married his college sweetheart, Cathryn Stringer, in October 2012.

Career

Theatre
Henry made his acting debut when he co-starred as Judas in the Paper Mill Playhouse (Milburn, New Jersey) production of Godspell in 2006. He was set to star in a 2008 Broadway transfer, but the project was cancelled.

In 2007, Henry appeared in the ensemble of the Off-Broadway musical In the Heights, re-joining the cast for the show's Broadway production. For In the Heights, the entire cast won a Drama Desk Award, and Henry and the ensemble won an ACCA Award for Outstanding Broadway Chorus from Actors' Equity Association.

Henry starred in Serenade, which played off-Broadway from December 9, 2007, to December 15, 2007.

Henry played the Tin Man in The Wiz at the New York City Center in 2009.

In June 2009, Henry contributed original music to the off-Broadway musical Shafrika, The White Girl at the Vineyard Theatre.

From March 24, 2010 to July 20, 2010 he played "Favorite Son" in the original Broadway cast of the Green Day musical American Idiot.

Henry then joined the Broadway cast of The Scottsboro Boys, directed and choreographed by Susan Stroman with a score by John Kander and Fred Ebb. He portrayed Haywood Patterson, for which he achieved critical praise. The Star Tribune wrote of his performance, "Joshua Henry ... ignites the role of Haywood Patterson as the lightning rod for our identification with the men." Charles Isherwood in The New York Times asserted that Henry "gives a performance of keen intensity as Haywood Patterson, an illiterate young man who becomes the focus of our sympathy as he steadfastly refuses to sign his name to a lie in order to obtain parole. Mr. Henry performs Haywood’s ballad of hopeless yearning, "Go Back Home," with a powerful simplicity that slashes through the evening's artifice." Despite these positive reviews, The Scottsboro Boys closed within a month. For his performance, Henry was nominated for the 2011 Tony Award for Best Actor in a Musical, but lost to Norbert Leo Butz in Catch Me If You Can.

On January 22, he was among the performers in the Broadway Memories concert performance in New York, in which he performed selections from The Scottsboro Boys.

On March 2, 2011, he performed with The Scottsboro Boys''' original Broadway cast in Stro!, a gala celebration honoring Susan Stroman.

From March 15, 2011 until the show's closing on April 24, 2011 he returned to the role of "Favorite Son" in American Idiot.

Henry attended and performed at a MCC Miscast Gala in New York, held on March 15, 2011. The performance showcases "Broadway's hottest stars performing songs from roles in which they would never be cast."

On April 10, 2011, he returned to the University of Miami to perform in their Broadway Unplugged concert. In addition, Henry and the cast of The Scottsboro Boys performed in the May 16, 2011, performance of Broadway Sensation in New York City.

Henry performed the role of Jake in the American Repertory Theater's production of Porgy and Bess, which began previews August 17, 2011, at the Loeb Drama Center in Cambridge, Massachusetts. It officially opened on August 31 and ran through September 30, 2011. It transferred to the Richard Rodgers Theatre on Broadway where it played from January 12 until September 23, 2012.

Henry originated the roles of Hercules Mulligan, James Madison, and King George III in the Vassar College workshop of Lin-Manuel Miranda’s Hamilton.

Henry performed the role of Flick in the Roundabout Theatre production of Violet which began in April, 2014.  On April 29, 2014, he was nominated for a Tony in the category of Best Actor in a Featured Role in a Musical.

He appeared in the role of Noble Sissle in the 2016 production of Shuffle Along, or, the Making of the Musical Sensation of 1921 and All That Followed at the Music Box Theatre on Broadway. Henry starred as Jamie alongside Cynthia Erivo in a one-night benefit concert performance of Jason Robert Brown's The Last Five Years on September 12, 2016. Proceeds from the performance went to the Brady Center, a national gun violence organization. Henry had also performed in a one-night concert performance of another one of Brown's shows, Parade, at the Lincoln Center.

In 2016 and 2017, Henry starred in the lead role of Aaron Burr in the first US tour and Chicago productions of Hamilton: An American Musical.

In 2018, Henry starred as Billy Bigelow alongside Jessie Mueller in the third revival of Rodgers and Hammerstein's Carousel, for which he received a Tony Award nomination.

On November 18, 2020, it was announced Henry would reprise his role of Burr in a special performance with the cast of Hamilton for the Macy's Thanksgiving Day Parade.

In 2021, he starred as Dr. Pomatter in Waitress alongside Ciara Renèe.

In May 2022, it was announced Henry would star as Rapunzel’s Prince in the Broadway revival of Into the Woods that would open in June of that year. He left the production on October 9 for the filming of Beauty and the Beast: A 30th Celebration and was replaced by Andy Karl. Henry returned to the production after Karl’s extended run ended December 2. Henry would stay with the production until its final performance on January 8, 2023. During the run he would star opposite Gavin Creel, Cheyenne Jackson, Karl, Sara Bareilles, Brian d'Arcy James, Patina Miller, Stephanie J. Block, Montego Glover, Joaquina Kalukango, Sebastian Arcelus, Phillipa Soo, and Krysta Rodriguez.

Film and television
Henry appeared in the first Sex and the City film in 2008.

Henry has also appeared on the television series Kings and Nip/Tuck, as well as the 2010 short film Once Upon a Time in Australia.

Henry also appeared in the role of Corporal Quincy Montclair on season 7 of the Lifetime series Army Wives.

Henry also starred in the film adaptation of Jonathan Larson's musical tick, tick... BOOM! as Roger Bart. He starred alongside Andrew Garfield, Alexandra Shipp, Robin de Jesús, Vanessa Hudgens, and Bradley Whitford. It was released in November 2021.

In December 2022, Henry starred as Gaston in Beauty and the Beast: A 30th Celebration. He starred alongside H.E.R., Josh Groban, Martin Short, David Alan Grier, Shania Twain, Rizwan Manji, and Rita Moreno.

Music
On September 23, 2008, Henry performed in a concert performance titled Party Worth Crashing in New York City.

Henry, along with Corbin Bleu and Andréa Burns, was featured on "Dare to Go Beyond: The Album", by the nonprofit organization R.Evolución Latina. It was released on December 13, 2010, produced by Luis Salgado.

On January 16, 2011, Henry, Laura Osnes, and Natalie Weiss were featured performers in Kait Kerrigan and Bree Lowdermilk's You Made This Tour concert at the Laurie Beechman Theatre.

Henry performed in the 92nd Street Y's Lyrics & Lyricists event, honoring Burton Lane, on February 14, 2011.

On February 12, 2021, Henry released his EP Guarantee.

On September 10, 2021, Henry released his debut album Grow.

On December 13, 2022 Henry released his single Can't Nobody Tell Us Nothin'''.

Acting credits

Theatre

Film and television

Awards and nominations

References

External links
Joshua Henry's official website

Lortel Archives profile

1984 births
Living people
African-American male actors
Male actors from Florida
Male actors from Winnipeg
American male stage actors
American male film actors
American male musical theatre actors
American male television actors
University of Miami alumni
Black Canadian male actors
Canadian male stage actors
Canadian people of African-American descent
Canadian male musical theatre actors
Canadian male film actors
Canadian male television actors
Canadian expatriate male actors in the United States
20th-century African-American male singers
21st-century African-American people